Dušan Belić (Serbian Cyrillic: Душан Белић; born 29 March 1971) is a Serbian retired football goalkeeper and former head coach. He is currently the sporting director of FK Dinamo Pančevo.

Playing career

Club career
He played for FK Hajduk Beograd, PSK Pančevo and FK Dinamo Pančevo. In 1997, he moved to Belgium where he would play for Sint-Truiden in the Belgian League for eight and a half years playing a total of 224 league matches. With the team, he reached the 2003 Belgian Cup Final.

In 2006, he moved to Canada where he played and captained the Serbian White Eagles FC under Dragoslav Šekularac. He made his debut on 19 May 2006 against Italia Shooters. In his debut season, he clinched the International Division title, and helped the team post the best defensive record. He featured in the championship final against Italia Shooters but his team fell short after a 1-0 defeat.

International career
Belić was a goalkeeper for the Yugoslavia national futsal team that qualified for the 1992 FIFA Futsal World Championship but Yugoslavia was banned from competing due to international sanctions.

Post-playing career
Prior to the 2007 CSL season, Belić was named the player-coach for the Serbian White Eagles and Siniša Ninković was named the assistant coach. Midway through the season, Belić resigned from his position in order to accept a scouting position in Slovenia. Ninković was then promoted to head coach. In 2020, Belić was named the sporting director of Dinamo Pančevo.

Personal life
Belić has three sons: Ognjen, Luka and Kristijan and he holds both Serbian and Belgian citizenship.

Honours

Player
Serbian White Eagles
 Canadian Soccer League International Division: 2006

References 

Living people
1971 births
Sportspeople from Pančevo
Serbian footballers
Serbian men's futsal players
Sint-Truidense V.V. players
Belgian Pro League players
Canadian Soccer League (1998–present) players
Serbian White Eagles FC players
Serbian White Eagles FC managers
Serbian football managers
Serbian expatriate footballers
Serbian expatriate football managers
Canadian Soccer League (1998–present) managers
FK Dinamo Pančevo players
FK Hajduk Beograd players
Association football goalkeepers
Association football player-managers
Association football coaches
Association football scouts
Serbian expatriate sportspeople in Belgium
Serbian expatriate sportspeople in Canada
Serbian expatriate sportspeople in Slovenia
Expatriate footballers in Belgium
Expatriate soccer players in Canada
Expatriate soccer managers in Canada
Futsal goalkeepers